While most of local Hong Kong movies were filmed locally, several foreign movies were also, at least partly, set in Hong Kong. The following is a list of foreign movies set in Hong Kong.

Foreign movies
Godzilla vs. Kong (2021)
Hello, Love, Goodbye (2019)
6 Underground (2019)
Skyscraper (2018)
Tomb Raider (film) (2018)
 Geostorm (2017)
 Ghost in the Shell (2017 film) (2017)
 XXX: Return of Xander Cage (2017)
 Machine of Human Dreams (2016)
 Doctor Strange (2016)
 Snowden (2016)
 Blackhat (2015)
 It's Already Tomorrow in Hong Kong (2015)
 Transformers: Age of Extinction (2014)
 Pacific Rim (2013)
 Man of Tai Chi (2013)
 Fast & Furious 6 (2013)
 Battleship (2012)
 Double Dhamaal (2011)
 Johnny English Reborn (2011)
 Contagion (2011)
 Hong Kong Confidential (2010)
 Daddy Cool (2009) – Malayalam Film
 I Come with the Rain (2009) – starring Josh Hartnett
 Irreversi (2009)
 Vengeance (2009)
 Street Fighter: The Legend of Chun-Li (2009)
 Push (2009)
 Largo Winch (2008)
 Aegan (2008) – Tamil film
 The Dark Knight (2008) – with Batman breaking into International Finance Centre II (IFC Two)
 The Bucket List (2007) – scene in a bar between Morgan Freeman and Rowena King
 Awarapan (2007)
 La Moustache (2005)
 Parenni Maya Jalaima (2004)
 The Hitchhiker's Guide to the Galaxy (2005) – seen in the warning scene
 King (2003) – Tamil film
 Lara Croft Tomb Raider: The Cradle of Life (2003) – the International Finance Centre is used as an exterior with Times Square as an interior
 Die Another Day (2002) – James Bond emerges from the waters of Victoria Harbour into the Royal Hong Kong Yacht Club, after escaping custody; as he emerges the background of Hong Kong island is visible but the RHKYC is on the Hong Kong side so Bond is obviously on the Kowloon side and is not actually at the Hong Kong Yacht Club
 Citizen Hong Kong (2001)
 Rush Hour 2 (2001) – a side alley of Lan Kwai Fong is used as the exterior of a nightclub. Filming also took place at the airport and other attractions
 Spy Game (2001) – where the local HSBC headquarters are presented as the "US embassy"; there is no embassy in Hong Kong; there is a consulate-general
 The Art of War (2000)
 Rush Hour (1998)
 Knock Off (1998) – filmed around the streets of Sheung Wan and near Kai Tak
 Three Businessmen (1998) – starring Miguel Sandoval and Robert Wisdom
 Home Alone 3 (1997) – featured the landscape of Hong Kong in the beginning
 Chinese Box (1997) – set and made at the time of Hong Kong's handover to the People's Republic of China; the movie shows the actual temporary press room, specially set up for the press coverage of the handover, and located in the old part of the Exhibition Centre
 The Pillow Book (1996) – by Peter Greenaway
 White Ghost (1996) – a made-for-television Cracker movie; the last of the series until the recent revival
 Night Watch (1995) – Pierce Brosnan and Alexandra Paul
 Les Anges Gardiens (1995) – Gérard Depardieu takes the Star Ferry
 Godzilla vs. Destoroyah (1995) – Godzilla, covered with glowing lava-like rashes, destroys most of the city
 Mortal Kombat (1995)
 Hong Kong 97 (1994) – story revolving around the handover
 Double Impact (1991)
 Noble House (1988) – U.S. TV miniseries based on the novel by James Clavell, starring Pierce Brosnan; shot mostly on location in Hong Kong, featuring Jardine House as the headquarters for Struan's
 Tai-Pan (1986)
 Shanghai Surprise (1986) – starring Sean Penn and Madonna
 Year of the Dragon (1985)
 Bloodsport (1985) – with Jean-Claude Van Damme is filmed on Hong Kong Island and in Kowloon
 Banzaï (1983) – French film starring Coluche
 Forced Vengeance (1982)
 Oliver's Story (1979) – Love Storys sequel, starring Ryan O'Neal and Candice Bergen
 Revenge of the Pink Panther (1978)
 Felicity (1978) — includes footages of Aberdeen and Cheung Chau
 The Man From Hong Kong (1975) - the first Australian martial arts film
 Piedone a Hong Kong (1975)  – Italian movie featuring Bud Spencer
 Bons baisers de Hong Kong (From Hong Kong with Love) (1975)
 The Man with the Golden Gun (1974) – includes scenes of James Bond visiting the Bottoms Up, an actual bar in Tsim Sha Tsui, which was later moved to Wan Chai
 Enter the Dragon (1973) – the last movie of Bruce Lee
 Love Story (1970)
 A Countess from Hong Kong (1967) – starring Marlon Brando and Sophia Loren, directed by Charles Chaplin
 You Only Live Twice (1967)
 To Kill a Dragon (1967)
 The Vengeance of Fu Manchu (1967)
 Five Golden Dragons (1967) – movie 100% located in Hong Kong with opening footage set in the cross-harbor car ferry
 Gambit (1966)
 Up to His Ears (1965)
 Lord Jim (1965)
 Road to Hong Kong (1962)
 The World of Suzie Wong (1960) – includes footage of the Star Ferry
 Ferry to Hong Kong (1959) – starring Orson Welles and includes footage of the harbour
 The Scavengers (1959) - includes footage of the old Hong Kong–Macau Ferry Terminal
 Love Is a Many-Splendored Thing (1955) – starring William Holden and Jennifer Jones; includes shots from the old Foreign Correspondents' Club on Conduit Road, often mistaken for the Victoria Peak
 Hong Kong Confidential
 Hong Kong Affair (1958)
 Flight to Hong Kong (1956)
 Soldier of Fortune (1955) – starring Clark Gable and Susan Hayward
 Macao (1952) – starring Robert Mitchum and Jane Russell
 Hong Kong (1951) – starring Ronald Reagan, Rhonda Fleming and Lee Marvin
 They Met in Bombay (1941)

See also
 List of films based on location
 List of films set in Macau
 List of films set in Shanghai
 List of Hong Kong films of the 2010s

References

External links
 Hong Kong Film Services Office
 Hong Kong Film Archive
 電影朝聖（Film Pilgrimage）- This site gathered many significant film locations in Hong Kong.

 
Hong Kong
Set